DeKuyper Royal Distillers is a privately held Dutch company in the business of manufacturing and marketing distilled spirits and liqueurs.

The company  was founded in 1695 by Petrus De Kuyper as a manufacturer of barrels and casks used in the transportation of spirits and beer. His last name, De Kuyper, actually meaning the cooper. By 1752, the family owned a distillery in Schiedam which was then the leading center for the production of Dutch gin or genever. In the 19th century, the company expanded its export business throughout Europe, Great Britain and Canada. In 1911, a new distillery was built in Schiedam and thereafter the production of liqueur began. The roster of flavors slowly expanded, and partnerships were formed with distillers in Canada (1932) and the United States (1934, strategically at the end of Prohibition). By the 1960s the production of liqueurs had overtaken the production of genever as drinks tastes changed and the promotion of liqueurs for use in cocktails induced a surge in sales.

After prohibition, De Kuyper sold the right to manufacture and market their brands in the United States to National Distillers. In 1996, National Distillers sold its liquor and distilling interests including rights to market DeKuyper brands in the US to Jim Beam Brands. American consumers know the brand as John DeKuyper & Son, which makes generally inexpensive liqueurs such as Triple Sec and various flavors of Schnapps such as Pucker, generally for consumption in sweet cocktails or shots.

In 1995, on the occasion of its 300th anniversary, the company received the title “Royal” from Queen Beatrix of the Netherlands. This led to the company changing its name from Johannes de Kuyper & Zoon to De Kuyper Royal Distillers. In the same year, Erven Warnink - the leading producer of advocaat and cream liqueurs – was taken over by De Kuyper Royal Distillers.

Current product line
The current product line of the DeKuyper brand includes:

Liqueurs

Almond, Amaretto, Anisette, Blood Orange, Blue Curaçao, Cactus Juice Margarita, Chocolate Cherry, Chocolate Chili, Chocolate Mint, Coconut Amaretto, Coffee, Crème de Cacao (dark and white), French Vanilla, Ginger, Hazelnut, Mad Melon, Melon, Orange Curaçao, Peachtree, Razzmatazz, San Tropique Tropical Rum, sloe gin, triple sec, and Wild Strawberry.

Crème liqueurs

Crème de Noyaux, Crème de banane, Crème de Cacao (white and dark), Crème de Café, Crème de Cassis, and Crème de menthe (green and white).

Schnapps

Apple Barrel, BlueBerry, ButterShots, Crantasia, HotDamn! (100-proof Cinnamon and 30-proof Cinnamon), Key Largo Tropical, Mountain Strawberry, Old Tavern Root Beer, Peach, Peppermint, Pomegranate, Spearmint, Tropical Pineapple, and WilderBerry. Also the tart "Puckers" line, which includes Berry Fusion, Strawberry Passion, Cheri-Beri, Grape, Island Blue, Peach, Raspberry, Sour Apple, and Watermelon.

Fruit brandies

Apricot, Blackberry, Cherry, Ginger, Kirschwasser Cherry, New England Style Coffee, Peach.

Shots Ready-To-Drink
Alabama Slammer, Kamikaze, Lemon Drop, Red Headed, Sex on the Beach, Washington Apple.

References

External links

About DeKuyper
Gourmet Review of DeKuyper Truffles Liqueur in the West Coast Midnight Run art book 2013 edition

Alcoholic drink brands
Distilleries in the Netherlands
Henokiens companies
Dutch brands
Companies based in South Holland
Companies established in 1695
Schiedam
1695 establishments in the Dutch Republic
Cream liqueurs